Dustin Fuselier, known in his stage name D:Fuse, is an American producer, remixer and DJ based out of Los Angeles, California.

Career 

D:Fuse began his musical career in Austin, Texas writing and performing industrial music under the name "Culture Industry" as a drummer and singer before he turned to DJing. In 1998, he teamed up with his good friend Shane Howard to form Expansion. The two pressed their first two tracks themselves and circulated the vinyl at that year's WMC. Within months, the singles "Feel" and "Listen" were being played out by Timo Maas, Sasha, John Digweed, Chris Fortier, Danny Howells, and a host of other leading DJs. "Feel" was also selected by Dave Seaman for his Global Underground "Buenos Aires" compilation and, within months, the D:Fuse name was known in the worldwide dance music scene.

In 1998, D:Fuse was signed to the electronic music label Moonshine Records, releasing three mix compilations and selling well over 120,000 CDs and singles on the imprint including his first solo club hit "Body Shock". In 2001, D:Fuse was plucked out of the Lone Star State for his DJ skills, by Paul Oakenfold. Two consecutive North American 'Perfecto' tours comprising over 50 sold-out dates ensued, plus DJ appearances in England, Scotland, Switzerland, Ibiza, Canada and Mexico. This was followed up with a double CD mix compilation for Oakenfold's "Perfecto Presents..." series (in conjunction with V2 Records in the USA). "People" was released in February 2002 and immediately entered the CMJ Chart at number 9. Perfecto subsequently released "She Rides" by D:Fuse & Joy. This track appeared on numerous Perfecto compilations as well as the Gatecrasher mix series, achieving combined sales of over 200,000 units.

D:Fuse released "People_2: Both Sides Of The Picture", a 2xCD mix for System Recordings, in 2003. This compilation proved to be one of D:Fuse's most successful works to date, and further established his name as a producer, since this release featured eight new D:Fuse productions. He was featured on the cover of both REMIX and URB magazines, and joined the select list of performers at the legendary Coachella Festival that same year.

In 2004, D:Fuse was voted URB magazine's #2 Winter Music Conference DJ. He also released his debut artist album "Begin" on System Recordings to much positive acclaim. Splitting recording time between England, Los Angeles and Chicago to create a varied musical landscape, "Begin" broke new boundaries. D:Fuse's signature fusion of electronic programming and organic instrumentation, coupled with its inspired lyric writing and vocals, re-wrote all the rules of the DJ 'artist album'. This long-awaited debut received 4 star reviews across the board in the industry media, and the single release "Living The Dream" (featuring Jes of Motorcycle) achieved combined compilation sales in excess of 140,000 units.

"Begin" finally provided D:Fuse with the artistic space he needed to carefully experiment with - and skillfully integrate - musical themes that had influenced him, and his unique sound, over the years: from lush downtempo to driving basslines, funky percussion, and memorable melodies. Accordingly, his live shows began attracting more varied audiences since his music was proving to be equally palatable to both house and progressive music aficionados. The accompanying "Begin" tour was a massive success and hit 75 cities throughout North and South America.

In 2005 D:Fuse saw his fan base grow significantly, being voted one of the Top 15 progressive DJs in North America per the influential BPM/djmixed.com poll. D:Fuse soon teamed up with Mike Hiratzka to produce what would become one of the year's most sought after remixes: "The Days Of Swine And Roses", originally recorded by My Life With The Thrill Kill Kult. This became the biggest selling single release from the popular "My Life Remixed" CD - a compilation of Thrill Kill Kult classic tracks remixed by various artists.

D:Fuse has always been a true innovator on the club scene, fusing live instrumentation with DJing in the form of live percussion for the past six years. In 2005 he unveiled "The D:Fuse Live Experience", a DJ/live instrumentation hybrid featuring D:Fuse on a full percussion set up, Mike Hiratzka on guitar, bass, keyboards and vocals, plus vocals by MC Flint. The show coincided with the live CD release of "People_3" on Moist Music, recorded at clubs in San Francisco, CA and Austin, TX. The CD produced top reviews in REMIX and M3 magazines and on countless websites. The D:Fuse live tour was well received nationwide with capacity events in Los Angeles, San Francisco, Austin, Dallas, New York City, Kansas City, and a headlining slot at Miami's 2006 ULTRA Music Fest.

D:Fuse's live show concept led to a team-up with The Scumfrog in 2006 to create their much-hailed project "DJs Are Alive" alongside DJ Skribble, Kristine W and Static Revenger. The project continued to spark the idea that DJ sets can inspire so much more, both audibly and visually.

In 2006 D:Fuse relocated to Los Angeles to launch a new record label (Lost Angeles Recordings), and produce a full-length album, with his new production partner Mike Hiratzka. A full year of intense studio sessions produced "Skyline Lounge," D:Fuse and Hiratzka's most ambitious work to date. The album delved even further into the use of live instrumentation with guitars, bass and percussion. It also included violins by Govinda of 18th St.. Records fame, and featured guest vocal performances by Kristy Thirsk (Delerium) and DJ Rap, plus vocal performances by D:Fuse and Hiratzka themselves. "Skyline Lounge" stayed in the top 15 on the iTunes electronica chart five weeks in a row and was a heavy rotation pick on XM/Sirius chill, Below Zero FM in San Francisco, and Smoothlounge.com as well as a host of club mix shows worldwide.

Later that year D:Fuse unveiled his new live concept "Bring The Drums" residency to a capacity crowd at San Francisco's renowned Ruby Skye. The new show spotlighted D:Fuse performing on his most expansive drum kit yet, featuring his signature blend of congas and bongos plus tom-toms, snares and cymbals. D:Fuse rolled out the tour to cities across the nation and later brought "BTD" to tours in Asia and Eastern Europe; concluding the tour as a headliner at the massive closing party of the Kazatip festival in Ukraine drawing over 10,000 people.

In 2007 D:Fuse began work on his release "Thanks for Listening (The Club Singles '98-'08 Re:Mixed Re:Mastered)". He spent over a year in the studio completely reworking, remixing, and remastering his classic tracks into a 12-song package including "She Rides", "Everything With You", "Living the Dream" and a brand new collaboration with The Scumfrog titled "Stereo & Video". Tracks from the album were immediately hammered by Armin Van Buren, Paul Van Dyk, Paul Oakenfold, Kosheen, Matt Darey, Solarstone, and Andy Moor and the album received solid reviews in M8, IDJ, and DJ Mag Ukraine as well as a plethora of websites internationally.

D:Fuse can currently be heard on "The People's Mix" in podcast form. D:Fuse recently celebrated his 250th "People's Mix" broadcast. D:Fuse also works to further good causes. In 2004 he co-created the "Beats Against Bush" tour alongside Richard Vission and worked nationally with the Drug Policy Alliance against the Rave Act in 2003. Today he is organizing "Earth:66" (www.earth66ride.com), a charity bike ride dedicated to raising money and awareness for earth-related issues and for the organization Global Green.

In 2009 D:Fuse wrapping up studio sessions with Mike Hiratzka to complete their newest mix album series titled "Clubbing in Lost Angeles" which features 11 tracks from the Lost Angeles recordings catalogue. It seamlessly intertwines club hits like "Massif", "Perfection", and "Everything With You" with all new productions including "Tobias" and D & H remixes of Govinda's "Can't Forget The Day" and Nosmo & Kris Bís "One For The Road".

Now, Dustin Fuselier practices real estate passing the California Real Estate exam. Moving out to California to pursue this living with his family of eight, including five animals; two cats and three dogs.

Discography

Albums 
 2001: Progressive Mix Session 1.0
 2002: People
 2003: People 2: Both Sides of the Picture
 2004: Begin
 2005: People 3: Both Sides of the Picture
 2007: Skyline Lounge
 2009: Human Frequency
 2011: Human Frequency 2.0

References

External links 
 Official Website
 
 Lost Angeles Recordings Website

American DJs
Record producers from Texas
Living people
Year of birth missing (living people)